St. Paraskevi's Church is a church in Valësh, Elbasan County, Albania. It became a Cultural Monument of Albania in 1963.

References

Cultural Monuments of Albania
Buildings and structures in Elbasan
Churches in Albania